Nicholas Cutulle (October 10, 1942 – August 13, 2005) was an American football player and coach. He served as the head football coach at Western Connecticut State University from 1970 to 1971.

References

1942 births
2005 deaths
Western Connecticut State Colonials football coaches
Western Connecticut State Colonials football players
High school football coaches in Connecticut
Sportspeople from Waterbury, Connecticut
Players of American football from Connecticut